James Coughlin Shannon (July 21, 1896 – March 6, 1980) was an American politician and the 77th Governor of Connecticut.

Biography
Shannon was born in Bridgeport, Connecticut on July 21, 1896. He was the son of Henry E. Shannon and Ellen Coughlin Shannon. He completed his bachelor's degree from Georgetown University in 1918, and completed his LL.B. degree from Yale Law School in 1921. He married Helen M. McMurray on April 15, 1925. The couple had two sons, John H., and James C. Jr.; as well as one daughter, Helen Clair Richards.

Career
Shannon became Bridgeport's prosecuting attorney in 1923. He held that position for nine years. He was on the bench of the Bridgeport City and Juvenile Courts from 1931 to 1935. He was the attorney for the Connecticut Federation of Labor from 1939 to 1948. In 1948 he was a delegate to Republican National Convention from Connecticut. As a member of the US Navy Reserve, he served as an aviator in the U.S. Navy Air Force during World War I.

Shannon served as the 89th Lieutenant Governor of Connecticut from 1947 to 1948. James L. McConaughy, the Governor of Connecticut at the time, died on March 7, 1948. Shannon became the governor on the same day. During his term, legislation was constituted that raised old-age pension benefits. He was also successful in securing the appropriate legislation regarding housing reform measures. He was unsuccessful in his re-election bid in 1948, and left office on January 5, 1949.

After leaving office, Shannon was on the bench of the Connecticut Superior Court from 1953 to 1965. He was a member of Republican National Committee from Connecticut in 1952. He also was an associate justice of the Connecticut Supreme Court from 1965 to 1966.

Death
Shannon died at a convalescent hospital in Fairfield on March 6, 1980. He is interred in Oak Lawn Cemetery in Fairfield, Connecticut.

References

Further reading
 Sobel, Robert and John Raimo. Biographical Directory of the Governors of the United States, 1789-1978. Greenwood Press, 1988.

External links

The Political Graveyard
National Governors Association

1896 births
1980 deaths
Georgetown University alumni
Republican Party governors of Connecticut
Politicians from Bridgeport, Connecticut
Yale Law School alumni
20th-century American politicians
Lawyers from Bridgeport, Connecticut
Justices of the Connecticut Supreme Court
20th-century American judges
20th-century American lawyers